Duncan Greive was born in Auckland in 1979. He is best-known as the founder and managing editor of The Spinoff, a subscriber- and sponsor-funded online magazine based in Auckland.

Life and career 
Greive spent the first 10 years of his life in South London. His English mother worked as a social worker, and his New Zealand-born father held down several jobs. In 1990 the family returned to New Zealand, where his father worked as the managing director of a travel agency. Both parents became major shareholders in the Barkers fashion label. Greive attended Auckland Grammar and the University of Auckland, where he studied history.

Greive left university at 21 before graduating to take up a job as a postie, as he was about to become a father. He went on to finish his history degree part-time. While delivering mail he found work as a reviewer for the Auckland music magazine Real Groove. After the editor John Russell resigned in 2004, Greive was not chosen to replace him, as he didn't have a journalism qualification. So he enrolled in the Auckland University of Technology postgraduate journalism course. Three months after graduating he became the editor of Real Groove. 

By 2009, Greive was working in marketing for the Auckland fashion label Barkers, and working as a freelance journalist. Since 2012 he has written for New Zealand Geographic, Metro, North & South, The Guardian, Pantograph Punch, The Listener, Faster Louder and Sky Sport Magazine, the New Zealand Herald, Stuff, Newshub and Radio New Zealand. In 2015 he co-wrote Dan Carter: My Story with former All Black Dan Carter. The autobiography, published by Auckland publisher Upstart Press, was the biggest-selling book in New Zealand in 2015 and won Best Autobiography in the 2016 Sportel Awards.

Greive lives in Auckland with his wife, Nicola, and three children, Jett, Robyn and Vivienne.

The Spinoff 
In 2014 Greive launched The Spinoff, an online news site publishing breaking news, politics, pop culture, reviews and social issues across a range of platforms. The business is owned by Grieve and his wife Nicola, a lawyer at the Serious Fraud Office. It operates as a website and a copywriting agency; Spinoff staff writers are funded by subscribers and commercial sponsors. The site began as a blog about TV shows sponsored by streaming platform Lightbox. The Spinoff also publishes daily newsletters and podcasts.

"The Spinoff was a combination of an accident and an experiment," Greive told the University of Auckland in a 2017 series on alumni titled 40 under 40: Influencers. "The traditional funding model for journalism is fundamentally broken and I wanted to see if I could create a new model that allowed me to grow a business that’s a combination of a media company and a creative agency."

Publications

References 

1979 births
Music journalists
New Zealand editors
New Zealand magazine editors
New Zealand journalists
New Zealand columnists
People from Auckland
University of Auckland alumni
Living people